Kepala Batas (Jawi: كڤالا باتس, Kedahan: Kepala Bataih) is a small town in Kubang Pasu District, Kedah, Malaysia. The Sultan Abdul Halim Airport is located here.

References

Kubang Pasu District
Towns in Kedah